National Woman's Day U.S.A.
 National Women's Day South Africa
 National Women's Day (Tunisia)
 National Women's Day (Pakistan)

See also 

 International Women's Day